1787 in sports describes the year's events in world sport.

Boxing
Events
 18 January — the vacant Championship of England title was claimed by Tom Johnson following a win over William Warr at Oakingham in a 1 hour 20 minute fight or 1 hour 40 minute fight depending on the source. Johnson was then unbeaten in six known fights since 1783 and retained the title until 1791.
 June 1786 or 5 July, depending on source — Tom Johnson defended his title against William Fry at Kingston upon Thames, winning in 30 minutes or less depending on source.
 19 December — Tom Johnson defended his title against Michael Ryan at Wradsbury, winning in 24 to 30 minutes or less depending on source.
 Tom Tyne defeated the former champion George Meggs twice, but the fight locations are unknown.

Cricket
Events
 21 May — opening of the original Lord's ground in Marylebone for the White Conduit Club (WCC) v Middlesex match
 Marylebone Cricket Club (MCC) established at Lord's, chiefly by WCC members
England
 Most runs – James Aylward 296
 Most wickets – David Harris 29

Horse racing
England
 The Derby – Sir Peter Teazle
 The Oaks – Annette
 St Leger Stakes – Spadille

References

 
1787